{{DISPLAYTITLE:C3H6O}}
The molecular formula C3H6O may refer to:

Alcohols
Allyl alcohol or 2-propen-1-ol, CH2=CH-CH2OH, CAS number 
cyclopropanol or cyclopropyl alcohol,  cyclo (-CH2-CH2-HOHC-), CAS number 
Aldehydes
propanal or propionaldehyde, CH3CH2-CHO, CAS number 
Ketones
Propanone or acetone, CH3-CO-CH3, CAS number 
Enols (tautomers of aldehydes and ketones)
(E)-1-propen-1-ol, CH3-CH=CH-OH, CAS number 
(Z)-1-propen-1-ol, CH3-CH=CH-OH, CAS number 
propen-2-ol, CH2=C(OH)-CH3, CAS number  or 
Ethers
methyl vinyl ether or methoxyethene, H3C-O-CH=CH2, CAS number: 
oxetane or trimethylene oxide, cyclo(-CH2-CH2-O-CH2-), CAS number: 
1,2-epoxy-propane or Propylene oxide or methyl oxirane,  cyclo(-C*H(CH3)-CH2-O-), C* chiral, CAS number: 
(R)-(+)-methyl oxirane, CAS number 
(S)-(–)-methyl oxirane, CAS number